Giv'on HaHadashah (lit. New Gibeon) is an Israel settlement in the West Bank, built over land expropriated from the neighboring Palestinian villages of Biddu, Beit Ijza, and Al Jib. It falls under the jurisdiction of Mateh Binyamin Regional Council.

The international community considers Israeli settlements in the West Bank illegal under international law, but the Israeli government disputes this.

History
The settlement was originally established in 1895 by Yemenite Jews, but they left the location after a number of years. It was named after the biblical Gibeon, in Hebrew Giv'on (Joshua 10:10-12), situated nearby. The village was resettled in 1924, but its inhabitants fled as a result of the 1929 Palestine riots.

It was resettled again in 1977 by members of Gush Emunim, and the Israeli government eventually confiscated land from three nearby Palestinian villages in order to construct Giv'on HaHadasha roughly where the original Yemenite settlement's lands had been occupied:
186 dunams from Biddu,
159 dunams from Beit Ijza,
13 dunams from Al Jib.

The community eventually absorbed many Jewish emigrants from the former Soviet Union, as well as many Israeli-born Jews. Although it is mostly secular in character, it is also home to a few religiously observant families.

References

Jews and Judaism in Yemen
Populated places established in 1895
Populated places established in 1924
Populated places established in 1977
Jewish villages depopulated during the 1948 Arab–Israeli War
1929 Palestine riots
Mateh Binyamin Regional Council
1895 establishments in Ottoman Syria
1924 establishments in Mandatory Palestine
1977 establishments in the Israeli Military Governorate
Community settlements
Yemeni-Jewish culture in Israel
Gibeon (ancient city)
Israeli settlements in the West Bank